Edward Gamble (18 September 1935 – 31 December 2016) was a Canadian archer. He competed in the men's individual event at the 1976 Summer Olympics.

References

External links
 

1935 births
2016 deaths
Canadian male archers
Olympic archers of Canada
Archers at the 1976 Summer Olympics
Sportspeople from Leicester